Bottone is a surname. Notable people with the surname include:

Bonaventura Bottone (born 1950), English-born operatic tenor
Davide Bottone (born 1986), Italian footballer
Donato Bottone (born 1988), Italian footballer